Baláchka ( – conversation,  chat) is a Ukrainian dialect spoken in the Kuban and Don regions, where Ukrainian settlers used to live. It was strongly influenced by Cossack culture.

The term is connected with the Ukrainian term "balákaty'", which colloquially means "to talk", "to chat".

Some linguists characterize Balachka vernacular as a dialect or group of dialects. Balachka does not appear as a separate language on any language codes. Nevertheless, some Cossacks consider it to be a separate language and at least one academic case has been made in this regard.

Kuban-Black Sea Balachka 
The most significant instance of the Cossack dialect is the Kuban-Black Sea Balachka. Originally starting as a central Ukrainian dialect used by the Black Sea Cossacks who moved to the Kuban in 1792. Over the years the language began to acquire more Russian vocabulary, coinciding with the rising literacy rates in the late 19th century. The Kuban Cossack Chorus artistic director Viktor Zakharchenko points to the local folk songs dating to early and mid-19th century, where those that originated in the Kuban would have their own unique literary flavour and differ from those in standard Russian and Ukrainian. During the 1897 Russian census the dialect was classified as Little Russian (the traditional Russian name for Ukrainian) language rather than Great Russian (Russian).

Modern usage
It is not known how widespread the use of Balachka is. Education and strict requirements of the Russian Academy of Sciences mean that local press such as TV and radio adhere to standard Russian, with a notable exception for historical films (particularly those involving Cossacks) and Folk music groups and ensembles, such as the Kuban Cossack Chorus.

As a result, there has been a gradual erosion in the use of authentic dialects and accents, with unique terms being slowly replaced by standard Russian ones. This is particularly noticeable in the younger generations. At the same time, beginning in the early 1990s, the re-awakening of the Cossacks movement was often done with rekindling of old traditions. It is thus not surprising that many Cossacks use Balachka (or some of its elements) in their speech to punctuate their Cossack heritage and/or affiliation.

Political aspects

Political aspects have played a direct role in the classification of the Kuban Balachka. Although this Balachka was initially officially classified as a dialect of the Little Russian language (the official term in pre-revolutionary Russia for the Ukrainian language), and some Ukrainian sources actively support the idea of Balachka being a dialect of the Ukrainian language, this is being contested by some Russian linguistic research, and some of the Kuban Cossacks themselves, who point out that already by the 1860s there was a separate dialect that morphed out of Ukrainian and Russian.

See also
 Bałak 
 Surzhyk, the use of Russian words on a Ukrainian grammar matrix.
 Russenorsk, a pidgin language that combines elements of Russian and Norwegian
 Diglossia, a situation of parallel usage of two closely related languages, one of which is generally used by the government and in formal texts, and the other one is usually the spoken informally

References

External links
 The Importance of Knowing Your Local Vernacular, Serghei G. Nikolayev
 Dialect map of Ukrainian language
 Dialect map of Russian language

Russian language varieties and styles
Ukrainian language varieties and styles
Ukrainian dialects
Russian dialects
Cossack culture